Welcome to Blue Island was the final recording of new studio material by Enuff Z'nuff before lead singer Donnie Vie left the group in 2002. As a result, Vie did not tour to support the album. However, the band continued playing shows at this time with lead guitarist Monaco taking over vocal duties. As was common for the band, Welcome To Blue Island was released first in Japan, where it charted at #90.

The U.S. version of the album with several bonus tracks came in June 2003 on the Perris Records label, where it became the label's top seller of 2004. The song "87 Days" is a live acoustic performance for a radio show with BulletBoys lead singer Marq Torien on co-vocals and future Guns N' Roses guitarist DJ Ashba on guitar. The songs "Roll Me," "Can't Wait," and "Z Overture" would all be used in the 2011 film Dahmer Vs. Gacy.

Track listing

Personnel
Donnie Vie – lead vocals, guitars and keyboards
Chip Z'Nuff – bass guitar, guitars and vocals
Johnny Monaco – lead guitar
Ricky Parent – drums

Additional personnel
DJ Ashba (Track 13)
Marq Torien (Track 13)

Production
Produced by Stemz & Seedz (Chip Z'Nuff and Donnie Vie)
Mixing – Chris Steinmetz, Jeff Luif, and Chris Shepard
Engineering – Chris Steinmetz, Jeff Luif, Dave Maragus

Release history

References 

Enuff Z'nuff albums
2003 albums